Tavrovo is a rural locality (a selo) and the administrative center of Tavrovskoye Rural Settlement, Belgorodsky District, Belgorod Oblast, Russia. Population:

Geography 
Tavrovo is located 17 km east of Maysky (the district's administrative centre) by road. Dubovoye is the nearest rural locality.

References 

Rural localities in Belgorodsky District